Laurel Springs School is a WASC-accredited K–12 distance learning school in Ojai, California, United States. Laurel Springs School offers personalized resources, customizable curricula, individualized teacher services, college advising and other services to families attending public and private school.

Laurel Springs High School received the United Nations Global 500 Roll of Honour Award in 1990.

Notable alumni

Actors
Jennifer Love Hewitt (born 1979), actress
Elijah Wood (born 1981), actor
Lindsay Lohan (born 1986), actress
Evan Rachel Wood (born 1987), actress
Emily Rios (born 1989), actress
Hayden Panettiere (born 1989), actress
Kristin Herrera (born 1989), actress
Rory Culkin (born 1989), actor
Kristen Stewart (born 1990), actress
Emma Roberts (born 1991), actress
Erin Sanders (born 1991), actress
Emily Osment (born 1992), actress
Cole Sprouse (born 1992), actor
Dylan Sprouse (born 1992), actor
Josh Hutcherson (born 1992), actor
Malcolm David Kelley (born 1992), actor
Sofia Vassilieva (born 1992), actress
Miranda Cosgrove (born 1993), actress
Makenzie Vega (born 1994), actress
Sammi Hanratty (born 1995, actress
Chloë Grace Moretz (born 1997), actress
Kiernan Shipka (born 1999), actress
Isabella Acres (born 2001), actress

Athletes
Cade Cowell (born 2003), soccer player
Kellen Damico (born 1989), tennis player
Madison Hubbell (born 1991), ice dancer
Steele Johnson (born 1996), Olympic diver
Asia Muhammad (born 1991), tennis player
Noah Rubin (born 1996), tennis player
Frances Tiafoe (born 1998), tennis player
Tanith Belbin White (born 1984), ice dancer

Musicians
Bow Wow (born 1987), rapper
Jordin Sparks (born 1989), singer
Jewel Restaneo (born 1991), actress and musician
Nicole Jung (born 1991), singer and former member of Kara
Blaire Restaneo (born 1994), actress and musician
Grace VanderWaal (born 2004), singer, songwriter, and actress

Other
Jasper Soloff (born 1994), photographer and director
Kendall Jenner (born 1995), model, socialite, reality television personality
Kylie Jenner (born 1997), CEO of Kylie Cosmetics, socialite, reality television personality
Flynn McGarry (born 1998), chef

References

External links

High schools in Ventura County, California
Private high schools in California
Private middle schools in California
Private elementary schools in California
Online K–12 schools
Online schools in the United States